Mauno Nurmi (23 December 1936 – 12 July 2018) was a professional football and ice hockey player who played in the SM-liiga. He played for TPS (ice hockey) and TPS (football).  He was inducted into the Finnish Hockey Hall of Fame in 1986. He was born in Turku, Finland. In football, he played as a forward and made five appearances for the Finland national team between 1959 and 1966.

Honours
HC TPS
 SM-sarja (1): 1955–56

References

External links
 Finnish Hockey Hall of Fame bio

1936 births
2018 deaths
Finnish ice hockey players
Finnish footballers
HC TPS players
Turun Palloseura footballers
Finland B international footballers
Association football forwards
Finland international footballers
Sportspeople from Turku